Georg 'Peterle' Schentke (23 November 1919 – 25 December 1942) was a Luftwaffe ace and recipient of the Knight's Cross of the Iron Cross during World War II. The Knight's Cross of the Iron Cross was awarded to recognise extreme battlefield bravery or successful military leadership.

Career
Feldwebel Schentke served with 9./JG 3 from March 1940. He participated in the Battle of France, where he earned his first victory. Schentke also served during the Battle of Britain claiming 3 more victories.
He next took part in Operation Barbarossa, during 1941, flying wingman to Major Walter Oesau, who was his Gruppenkommandeur of III./JG 3. After 34 victories, Oberfeldwebel Schentke received the Ritterkreuz on 4 September 1941.

From November, over the winter, III./JG 3 was rotated from the front for recuperation, and including a short stint in Italy in January. Schentke briefly transferred to 2./JG 3 and flew escort missions for the transport planes flying in supplies to the Demyansk pocket. He then returned to 9./JG 3 and continued to score regularly. In late July 1942, after 71 confirmed victories, Schentke  was transferred to Ergänzungsgruppe Süd as an instructor, promoted to Leutnant and awarded the German Cross in Gold.

He returned to the Eastern Front in November 1942, joining 2./JG 3. Schentke was part of the volunteer Platzschutzstaffel (Airfield Defence squadron) Pitomnik. Their job was to defend the besieged 6th Army airfields near Stalingrad and protect the vulnerable transports on the last leg of their flights into the pocket. Over 6 weeks, in heavy snows and fogs and often with only 2 or 3 Bf 109's serviceable, this small unit claimed some 130 Soviet aircraft shot down. Schentke himself scored 29 victories including three on 10 December and six on 12 December in 5 missions.

On Christmas Day 1942 Schentke shot down a Soviet Il-2, but debris damaged his Bf 109G-2 (Black-3, W.Nr 13885) forcing him to bail out over Soviet positions to the west of the city. That was the last time he was seen alive. He was posthumously promoted to Oberleutnant.

During his career he was credited with 90 aerial victories, 4 over the Western Front and 86 over the Eastern Front, including at least 15 Il-2 Sturmoviks.

Awards
 Flugzeugführerabzeichen
 Front Flying Clasp of the Luftwaffe
 Iron Cross (1939)
 2nd Class
 1st Class
 Eastern Front Medal
 German Cross in Gold on 24 September 1942 as Oberfeldwebel in the 9./Jagdgeschwader 3
 Knight's Cross of the Iron Cross on 4 September 1941 as Oberfeldwebel and pilot in the 9./Jagdgeschwader 3
 List of people who disappeared

References

Citations

Bibliography

 Bergström. Christer & Mikhailov, Andrey (2001). Black Cross, Red Star Vol 2. Pacifica Military History. 
 Bergström. Christer; Dikov, Andrey; Antipov, Vlad (2006). Black Cross, Red Star Vol 3. Eagle Editions Ltd 
 Bergström. Christer (2007). Stalingrad – The Air Battle: 1942 through January 1943. Midland Publications 
 
 Musciano, Walter (1989). Messerschmitt Aces. Tab Books .
 
 
 Weal, John (1996). Bf109D/E Aces 1939-41. Oxford: Osprey Publishing Limited. .
 Weal, John (2001). Bf109 Aces of the Russian Front. Oxford: Osprey Publishing Limited. .
 Weal, John (2007). More Bf109 Aces of the Russian Front. Oxford: Osprey Publishing Limited. .

External links
Luftwaffe 1939-1945
TracesOfWar.com

1919 births
1940s missing person cases
1942 deaths
German Army personnel killed in World War II
German World War II flying aces
Luftwaffe pilots
Missing aviators
Missing in action of World War II
Missing person cases in Russia
People from Sulęcin County
People from the Province of Brandenburg
Recipients of the Gold German Cross
Recipients of the Knight's Cross of the Iron Cross
Shot-down aviators